The Shwe gas field is a natural gas field in Andaman Sea. It was discovered in 2004 and developed by and Daewoo. It began production in 2013 and produces natural gas and condensates. The total proven reserves of the Shwe gas field are around 9.1 trillion cubic feet (260 km³), and production is slated to be around 700 million cubic feet/day (20×105m³).

References

See also
Kyaukpyu Township
Sino-Burma pipelines

Natural gas fields in Myanmar